The 2006 National Hurling League, known for sponsorship reasons as the Allianz National Hurling League, was the 75th edition of the National Hurling League (NHL), an annual hurling competition for the GAA county teams. Kilkenny won the league, beating Limerick in the final.

Structure

Division 1
There are 12 teams in Division 1, divided into 1A and 1B. Each team plays all the others in its group once, earning 2 points for a win and 1 for a draw.
The first-placed teams in 1A and 1B advance to the NHL semi-finals.
The second- and third-placed teams in 1A and 1B advance to the NHL quarter-finals.
The fifth- and sixth-placed teams in 1A and 1B go into the relegation semi-finals and final.

Division 2
There are 11 teams in Division 2, divided into 2A and 2B.
The first-placed teams in 2A and 2B advance to the Division 2 semi-finals.
The second- and third-placed teams in 2A and 2B advance to the NHL quarter-finals.
The Division 2 champions are promoted.
The bottom two teams in 2A and 2B go into the relegation semi-finals and final.

Division 3
There are 9 teams in Division 3, divided into 3A and 3B.
The top two teams in 3A and 3B advance to the Division 3 semi-finals.
The Division 3 champions are promoted.
The other teams in 3A and 3B go into the Division 3 Shield.

Overview

Division 1
Brian Cody won his fourth league title with Kilkenny, and the second in succession, as 'the Cats' remained the only undefeated team throughout the entire league.  Limerick, who were league runners-up, also enjoyed an unbeaten run in the group stage courtesy of three wins and two drawn games with Kilkenny and Tipperary, however, they fell to Kilkenny in the final.

Down at the other end of the table, the four bottom-placed teams and relegation candidates were Antrim, Down, Laois and Wexford.  Laois, after losing all of their group stage games, eventually lost a play-off to Down and faced relegation for the following season.

Division 2
Dublin won the Division 2 title after an unbeaten run throughout the group and knock-out stages, thus returning to the top flight having been relegated the previous year.  Runners-up Kerry also remained undefeated until the last day of the league when they were defeated in the final by 'the Dubs'. Going down were Roscommon who recorded only one victory in the group stage before losing to London and Wicklow in the relegation play-offs.

Division 3

Armagh and Longford qualified for the league final in this division with Armagh winning promotion.

Division 1A

Kilkenny came into the season as defending champions of the 2004 season. Offaly entered Division 1 as the promoted team.

On 30 April 2006, Kilkenny won the title following a 3-11 to 0-14 win over Limerick in the final. It was their second league title in succession and their 13th National League title overall.

Laois, who lost all of their group stage matches, were relegated from Division 1 after losing both their matches in the relegation play-offs. Dublin won Division 2 and secured promotion to the top tier.

Limerick's Mark Keane was the Division 1 top scorer with 4-50.

Division 1A table

Group stage

Division 1B

Division 1B table

Group stage

Relegation play-offs

Semi-finals

Final

Division 1 Knockout

Quarter-finals

Semi-finals

Final

Scoring statistics

Top scorers overall

Top scorers in a single game

Division 2

On 30 April 2006, Dublin won the title following a 0-17 to 1-6 win over Kerry in the final. It was their first Division 2 title since 1997.

Roscommon, who lost all but one of their group stage matches, were relegated from Division 2 after losing both their matches in the relegation play-offs.

Division 2A table

Group stage

Division 2B table

Group stage

Relegation play-offs

Semi-finals

Final

Knock-out stage

Quarter-finals

Semi-finals

Final

Division 3

On 30 April 2006, Armagh won the title following a 3-10 to 1-11 win over Longford in the final. It was their first Division 3 title since 1999.

Division 3A table

Division 3B table

Knock-out stage

Quarter-finals

Semi-finals

Final

Shield

On 30 April 2006, Tyrone won the title following a 3-09 to 0-10 win over Sligo in the final.

Semi-finals

Final

References

External links
 All National Hurling League division results from 2006

 
National Hurling League seasons